The laughing gull (Leucophaeus atricilla) is a medium-sized gull of North and South America. Named for its laugh-like call, it is an opportunistic omnivore and scavenger. It breeds in large colonies mostly along the Atlantic coast of North America, the Caribbean, and northern South America. The two subspecies are: L. a. megalopterus – which can be seen from southeast Canada down to Central America, and L. a. atricilla which appears from the West Indies to the Venezuelan islands. The laughing gull was long placed in the genus Larus until its present placement in Leucophaeus, which follows the American Ornithologists' Union.

Name
The genus name Leucophaeus is from Ancient Greek λευκός : leukós, "white", and φαιός : phaios, "dusky". The specific atricilla is from Latin atra, "black", " unlucky" or "malevolent" and cilla, "tail".

According to the Helm Dictionary of Scientific Bird Names, Linnaeus may have intended to write atricapilla (black-haired), which would have been more appropriate, as the bird has a black head and white tail.

Range
It breeds on the Atlantic coast of North America, the Caribbean, and northern South America. Northernmost populations migrate farther south in winter, and this species occurs as a rare vagrant to western Europe. The laughing gull's English name is derived from its raucous kee-agh call, which sounds like a high-pitched laugh "ha... ha... ha...".

Laughing gulls breed in coastal marshes and ponds in large colonies. The large nest, made largely from grasses, is constructed on the ground. The three or four greenish eggs are incubated for about three weeks.

Description
The summer adult's body is white apart from the dark grey back and wings and black head. Its wings are much darker grey than all other gulls of similar size except the smaller Franklin's gull, and they have black tips without the white crescent shown by Franklin's. The beak is long and red. The black hood is mostly lost in winter.

Laughing gulls take three years to reach adult plumage. Immature birds are always darker than most similar-sized gulls other than Franklin's. First-year birds are greyer below and have paler heads than first-year Franklin's, and second-years can be distinguished by the wing pattern and structure.

Subspecies
The two subspecies are:

L. a. megalopterus (Bruch, 1855) — coastal southeast Canada, eastern & southern United States, Mexico & Central America
L. a. atricilla (Linnaeus, 1758) — West Indies to Venezuelan islands

Like most other members of the genus Leucophaeus, the laughing gull was long placed in the genus Larus. The present placement in Leucophaeus follows the American Ornithologists' Union.

Gallery

References

External links

 Laughing Gull - Larus atricilla - USGS Patuxent Bird Identification InfoCenter
 Laughing Gull Species Account - Cornell Lab of Ornithology
 Field Guide on Flickr
 Laughing Gull Bird Sound at Florida Museum of Natural History
 
 
 

laughing gull
Native birds of the Northeastern United States
Native birds of the Eastern United States
Native birds of the Southeastern United States
Birds of Central America
Birds of the Caribbean
Birds of the Dominican Republic
Birds of Venezuela
laughing gull
laughing gull
Taxobox binomials not recognized by IUCN